Erol Alkan (born 30 May 1974) is an English DJ and producer of Turkish Cypriot descent. He grew up in Archway in North London.

Career

DJ and club promoter

In 1993, Erol Alkan started DJing in various indie nightclubs in London. His first ever public DJ set was at The Gass Club in Leicester Square.

In 1995, he was a resident DJ of club night 'Going Underground' co-founded by Glyn Peppiatt and James Dickie. It was held weekly on Mondays at the Plastic People venue which was situated at its original Oxford Street location in Central London.

In 1997, Erol re-launched the club under a new name: Trash. Over the next few years, Trash became one of the most influential clubs of its time. Until its closure in 2007, Trash saw performances by Peaches, LCD Soundsystem, Klaxons, Bloc Party, 2manydjs, Yeah Yeah Yeahs, Scissor Sisters, Phoenix, Metronomy, Electric Six and many more up and coming bands.

From 2001 onwards, Erol Alkan became one of the most in demand Djs of the time, playing regular DJ sets outside Trash, focusing primarily on dance music influenced by his sets at Bugged Out. Bugged Out are credited as launching Erol's dance music career after offering him a residency halfway through his debut set for them at Fabric, when Erol filled in for David Holmes who had missed a flight into London. His profile increased considerably during 2003 when he was voted 'Best Breakthrough DJ' by Muzik magazine, and in 2006, when he earned the Mixmag  2006 "DJ of the Year" award. Erol has also been voted Datatransmissions 'DJ Of The Year' in both 2008 and 2009, which is seen as an alternative to the DJ Mag Top 100 awards but consists only of British DJs.

Since 2008, Alkan has also hosted a regular radio shows, as a former resident of BBC 6Music's 6Mix until 2015, moving onto a residency for online streaming platform Boiler Room in 2016. He returned to 6Music to for various shows during 2018, filling in for Nemone and Giles Peterson, as well as hosting both 2017 and 2018's New Year's Eve live specials.

In the summer of 2017, Erol programmed a 13-week residency at London's XOYO club, playing weekly alongside live and DJ guests including Boys Noize, Gerd Janson, Daniel Avery, Ellen Allien, Peggy Gou, 2ManyDJs, Francois K, Baris K, Peaches and Jimmy Edgar.

He has released multiple successful DJ mixes, including two editions of 'A Bugged Out/Bugged In' mix, a 2012 mix for revered Belgian festival I Love Techno and a 2014 contribution to the prestigious Fabriclive series that was later awarded 'Mix Of The Year 2014' by DJ Mag.

Remixer

Erol Alkan released a series of mash-ups using the alias Kurtis Rush in the early 2000s, including a mix of Kylie Minogue's "Can't Get You Out of My Head" and New Order's "Blue Monday", which was performed by Minogue at the Brit Awards. Erol also used the alias Mustapha 3000, and is half of the psychedelic dance-rock act Beyond the Wizard's Sleeve, along with Richard Norris. In 2016, Beyond The Wizard's Sleeve released a long-anticipated debut album, The Soft Bounce, featuring collaborations with artists such as Hannah Peel, Jane Weaver, Euros Childs and celebrated writer Jon Savage. In 2016, London record store Rough Trade featured The Soft Bounce as one of their  top ten records of 2016 in their annual end of year list.

Erol Alkan has remixed tracks from artists including Klaxons, Alter Ego, Bloc Party, Daft Punk, The Chemical Brothers, Gonzales, Tame Impala, MGMT, Yeah Yeah Yeahs, ZZT, Fan Death, Digitalism, Scissor Sisters, Justice, Franz Ferdinand, LA Priest, Interpol, Hot Chip, Death From Above 1979, Metronomy, Mylo, Night Works, Margot, Todd Rundgren, Kindness, Connan Mockasin, Depeche Mode and New Order.

In 2017, Alkan's label, Phantasy, released 'Reworks Volume 1', encompassing twenty of his best-loved remixes, and available as both a double-CD and limited-edition vinyl format. It was nominated for 'Best Compilation' in the 2017 DJ Mag Awards.

Producer

Erol Alkan began producing bands in 2006. Originally cutting his teeth recording B-sides for The Long Blondes and Mystery Jets, he was asked back to work on their respective second albums. His first production credit is the entire Mystery Jets' much loved second album, Twenty One, which contained the 2 top 40 hit singles "Young Love" and "Two Doors Down", Late of the Pier's debut record, Fantasy Black Channel, and The Long Blondes' second album Couples.

His third album production within that 18-month period was Late of the Pier's debut and only album Fantasy Black Channel, released 11 August 2008 on Parlophone Records. Cited as one of the greatest debut records of the 00's, it has reached cult classic status from both music fans and the media. It was awarded an alternative Album Of The Year accolade by Drowned In Sound, in which the public voted.

In 2007 Alkan founded his own label, named Phantasy, which has released music from Daniel Avery, Connan Mockasin, Ghost Culture, Tom Rowlands from The Chemical Brothers, Gabe Gurnsey, Cowboy Rhythmbox, Kamera, U and Alkan's own Beyond The Wizard's Sleeve Project, as well as his first EP of solo club tracks, 'Illumination' in 2013.

In 2017, Alkan produced the comeback LP from seminal British shoegaze band Ride titled 'Weather Diaries', and released to critical acclaim. He reunited with the band again for their 'Tomorrows Shore' EP and sixth album 'This Is Not A Safe Place', which was released in August 2019. 

Alkan also worked as additional producer on The Killers' hit single "The Man", providing additional instrumentation. He is currently working with Duran Duran.

Other work

He is also one half of psychedelic rock group Beyond the Wizard's Sleeve. BTWS have remixed tracks (often listed as "Re-Animations") for Peter Bjorn and John, Midlake, Simian Mobile Disco, Franz Ferdinand, Badly Drawn Boy, The Chemical Brothers, Goldfrapp, Late of the Pier, Tracey Thorn, Dust Galaxy, The Real Ones, and Findlay Brown. They've also released an album called "Ark 1" in 2008, and four EPs - "Birth", "Spring", "George" & "West".

Erol compiled a 2xCD mix for the Bugged Out series. The second disc, "A Bugged In Selection with Erol Alkan", is a collection of downtempo tracks. Erol has also released mix compilations for Muzik Magazine and Mixmag. He continues to expand on the much loved 'Bugged In Selection' mixes via a curated Spotify playlist which continues to collect music of a similar vein. 

Other productions: Whitey's "Do The Nothing", Franz Ferdinand's "All my Friends (LCD Soundsystem Cover)" and producing 'I'd Rather, Jack' for London noise band Teeth Of The Sea

Alkan was working on remixes for Björk and Interpol in summer 2007, but lost them due to a hard drive failure.

Discography

Original releases

Mix and compilation albums

Remixes as Erol Alkan

Remixes as Beyond the Wizards Sleeve

Producer / mixer

References

External links

 Phantasy Sounds official website
Erol Alkan on Spotify
 Erol Alkan on Resident Advisor
Erol Alkan on Instagram
Erol Alkan on Twitter

Audio links

 Erol Alkan on Souncloud

1974 births
Living people
English people of Turkish Cypriot descent
Club DJs
English electronic musicians
English record producers
Electro house musicians